Eriocranites is an extinct genus of moth in the family Elachistidae. It contains only one species, Eriocranites hercynicus, which was described from Willershausen in Germany. It is dated to the Pliocene.

References

Fossil Lepidoptera
Fossil taxa described in 1967
†
Pliocene insects
Fossils of Germany
†